{{Automatic taxobox
| fossil_range = 
| image = Diaceratherium aurelianense.JPG 
| image_caption = D. aurelianense skull
| taxon = Diaceratherium
| authority = Dietrich, 1931
| subdivision_ranks = Species
| subdivision =
D. lemanense Pomel, 1853
D. aurelianense Nouel, 1866D. asphaltense Depéret & Douxami, 1902D. aginense Répelin, 1917D. tomerdingense Dietrich, 1931 (type)D. lamilloquense Michel in Brunet, De Bonis & Michel, 1987D. askazansorense Kordikova, 2001
}}Diaceratherium'' is an extinct genus of rhinoceros from the Oligocene and Miocene of Eurasia.

Recent studies suggest that seven species are valid.

References

Oligocene rhinoceroses
Miocene rhinoceroses
Oligocene mammals of Europe
Miocene mammals of Europe
Oligocene mammals of Asia
Miocene mammals of Asia
Fossil taxa described in 1931